In mathematics, particular in abstract algebra and algebraic K-theory, the stable range of a ring  is the smallest integer  such that whenever  in  generate the unit ideal (they form a unimodular row), there exist some in  such that the elements  for  also generate the unit ideal.

Bass stable range
The Bass stable range condition  refers to precisely the same notion, but for historical reasons it is indexed differently: a ring  satisfies if for any  in  generating the unit ideal there exist  in  such that  for  generate the unit ideal.

Comparing with the above definition, a ring with stable range  satisfies . In particular, Bass's theorem states that a commutative Noetherian ring of Krull dimension  satisfies . (For this reason, one often finds hypotheses phrased as "Suppose that  satisfies Bass's stable range condition ...")

Stable range relative to an ideal
Less commonly, one has the notion of the stable range of an ideal  in a ring . As above, in this case we say that  satisfies the Bass stable range condition .

References 

Charles Weibel, The K-book: An introduction to algebraic K-theory

H. Chen, Rings Related Stable Range Conditions, Series in Algebra 11, World Scientific,
Hackensack, NJ, 2011.

External links 
Bass' stable range condition for principal ideal domains

K-theory